Adam Shapiro is a financial news Anchor at Yahoo Finance.  Prior to that, he was an anchor and investigative journalist at FOX Business Network (FBN). He joined FBN in September 2007 as a Washington DC based reporter and has reported extensively on the US Government, Treasury Department, Federal Reserve and White House.  
In 1998, Shapiro was hired as a news anchor at WEWS-TV (ABC) in Cleveland. While there, he also anchored Emmy Award-winning morning show Good Morning Cleveland. While there, he received a 2003 regional Emmy Award for Best Anchor and a 2002  Associated Press Award for Best Reporter.

Shapiro left Cleveland in June 2006 to work for New York's WNBC-TV. As a general assignment reporter for the local morning show Today in New York, he covered all aspects of New York City. He also occasionally anchored the early evening and nightly newscasts. In September 2018, it was announced that Shapiro would be going to work for Yahoo Finance as an anchor. He left and worked for Yieldstreet for a few months. Shapiro Works now in Buffalo New York as an assistant news director for WGRZ-TV channel 2.

References

External links

 Fox Business Channel (official)
  Adam Shapiro on Twitter (@ajshaps)

Living people
Syracuse University alumni
American television reporters and correspondents
People from Miami
Year of birth missing (living people)